Henry Highland Garnet (December 23, 1815 – February 13, 1882) was an American abolitionist, minister, educator and orator. Having escaped as a child  from slavery in Maryland with his family, he grew up in New York City. He was educated at the African Free School and other institutions, and became an advocate of militant abolitionism. He became a minister and based his drive for abolitionism in religion.

Garnet was a prominent member of the movement that led beyond moral suasion toward more political action. Renowned for his skills as a public speaker, he urged black Americans to take action and claim their own destinies. For a period, he supported emigration of American free blacks to Mexico, Liberia, or the West Indies, but the American Civil War ended that effort. In 1841 he married abolitionist Julia Williams and they had a family. Stella (Mary Jane) Weems, a runaway slave from Maryland, lived with the Garnets. She may have been adopted by them or employed as their governess. When Henry preached against slavery, he brought her up to talk about her own experiences and about her family still enslaved in Maryland. On one such trip in England, Garnet was hired by a Scottish church as a missionary. The family moved to Jamaica in 1852, and soon caught yellow fever. Stella died and was buried there. The rest, while sickened, boarded a ship for America. After the war, the couple worked in Washington, D.C.

On Sunday, February 12, 1865, he delivered a sermon in the U.S. House of Representatives while it was not session, becoming the first African American to speak in that chamber. on the occasion of Congress's passage on January 31 of the Thirteenth Amendment, ending slavery.

Early life and education

Henry Garnet was born into slavery in Chesterville (then New Market), Kent County, Maryland, on December 23, 1815. "[H]is grandfather was an African chief and warrior, and in a tribal fight he was captured and sold to slave-traders who brought him to this continent where he was owned by Colonel William Spencer." According to James McCune Smith, Garnet's father was George Trusty and his enslaved mother was "a woman of extraordinary energy." In 1824, the family, which included a total of 11 members, secured permission to attend a funeral, and from there they all escaped in a covered wagon, via Wilmington, Delaware, where they were helped by the Quaker and Underground Railroad stationmaster Thomas Garrett.

When Garnet was ten years old, his family reunited and moved to New York City, where from 1826 through 1831, Garnet attended the African Free School.  His education there was interrupted in 1828 when Garnet had to find employment, twice making the sea route to Cuba as a cabin boy and once as a cook and steward on a schooner running between New York City and Alexandria, Virginia.  It was when he returned from the latter voyage in 1829 that he found that his family had been located by slave hunters.  His sister, Eliza (born Mary), was arrested, but was able to free herself by proving residence in the free state of New York.  His father jumped off of the roof of a two-story building to escape the slave catchers.  Garnet, likely with his mother in mind, who had escaped by running to a corner store, took a knife and walked onto Broadway, waiting to be found and confronted by the slave catchers.  His friends found him instead and took him out of the city to Jericho, Long Island, where he stayed under the protection of Quaker Thomas Willis.  He then became an indentured servant to Captain Epenetus Smith of Smithtown, Long Island, but suffered an injury to his right leg and managed to be released from his indentures later in 1829, whereupon he returned to the African Free School for a year.

While in school, Garnet began his career in abolitionism. His classmates at the African Free School included Charles L. Reason, George T. Downing, and Ira Aldridge. From 1831, he continued his studies at the Phoenix High School for Colored Youth.  While a student there he began to attend a Sunday school at the First Colored Presbyterian Church and was baptized as a Christian by Reverend Theodore Sedgwick Wright, with whom he was friends for the remainder of Wright's life.

In 1834, Garnet,  William H. Day, and David Ruggles established the all-male Garrison Literary and Benevolent Association; "Garrison" is a reference to the famous abolitionist Wm. Lloyd Garrison, and indicates the character of the association. It garnered mass support among whites, but the club ultimately had to move due to racist feelings.

In 1835, Garnet enrolled at the new Noyes Academy in Canaan, New Hampshire, but anti-abolitionists soon destroyed the school building and forced the Negro students out of town. He completed his education at the Oneida Institute in Whitesboro, New York, which had recently begun admitting all races. Here he was acclaimed for his wit, brilliance, and rhetorical skills. The year after graduation in 1839, he injured his knee playing sports. It never recovered, and his lower leg had to be amputated in 1840 or 1841.

Julia Williams
In 1841, Garnet married Julia Williams, whom he had met as a fellow student at the Noyes Academy. She had also completed her education at the Oneida Institute. Together they had three children, only one of whom survived to adulthood.

Ministry

In 1839, Garnet moved with his family to Troy, New York, where he taught school and studied theology. In 1842, Garnet became pastor of the Liberty Street Presbyterian church, a position he held for six years. With his friend William G. Allen, also an Oneida alumnus, he published the National Watchman, an abolitionist newspaper. Closely identifying with the church, Garnet supported the temperance movement and became a strong advocate of political antislavery.   What is political antislavery?

Garnet sheltered fugitive slaves in his Liberty Street church, and philanthropist Gerrit Smith announced in his church his plan for giving grants of land to disenfranchised Black men (see Timbuctoo, New York).

He later returned to New York City, where he joined the American Anti-Slavery Society and frequently spoke at abolitionist conferences. One of his most famous speeches, "Call to Rebellion," was delivered to the 1843 National Convention of Colored Citizens, in Buffalo, New York. "Upon the conclusion of the Negro national convention of 1843, Garnet led a state convention of Negroes assembled in Rochester."

These conventions by black activists were called to work for abolition and equal rights. Garnet said that slaves should act for themselves to achieve total emancipation. He promoted an armed rebellion as the most effective way to end slavery. Frederick Douglass and William Lloyd Garrison, along with many other abolitionists both black and white, thought Garnet's ideas were too radical and could damage the cause by arousing too much fear and resistance among whites.

In 1848 Garnet relocated from Troy to Peterboro, New York, home of the great abolition activist Gerrit Smith. Garnet supported Smith's Liberty Party, a party of reform that was eventually absorbed into the Republican Party.

Anti-slavery role
Women's participation in the abolitionist movement was controversial and resulted in a split in the American Anti-Slavery Society. Arthur Tappan, Lewis Tappan, "and a group of Black ministers, including Henry Highland Garnet" founded the American and Foreign Anti-Slavery Society (AFAS). It "was committed to political abolitionism and to male leadership at the top levels."

By 1849, Garnet began to support emigration of blacks to Mexico, Liberia, or Haiti, where he thought they would have more opportunities. In support of this, he founded the African Civilization Society. Similar to the British African Aid Society, it sought to establish a West African colony in Yorubaland (part of present-day Nigeria). Garnet advocated a kind of Black nationalism in the United States, which included establishing Black colonies in the sparsely-inhabited Western territories. Other prominent members of this movement included minister Daniel Payne, J. Sella Martin, Rufus L. Perry, Henry M. Wilson, and Amos Noë Freeman.

In 1850, Garnet went to Great Britain at the invitation of Anna Richardson of the free produce movement, which opposed slavery by rejecting the use of products produced by slave labor. He was a popular lecturer, and spent two and a half years lecturing. At first, the work separated Garnet from his family, who remained back in New York State. While he was abroad, his seven-year-old son, James Crummell Garnet, died on March 1, 1851, while Garnet was abroad. His wife Julia, his young son Henry, and their adopted daughter Stella Weims joined Garnet in Great Britain later that year.

In 1852, Garnet was sent to Kingston, Jamaica, as a missionary. He and his family spent three years there; his wife Julia Garnet led an industrial school for girls. Garnet had health problems that led to the family returning to the United States.

After John Brown's raid on Harpers Ferry in 1859, Garnet in a sermon "declared [it] to be the duty of every man who loved the cause of freedom to declare that the Harper's Ferry movement was right, and that any one who would not say so boldly had much better say nothing at all." He was described as "friend and admirer" of "the heroic John Brown".

In 1859 Garnet was president of the African Civilization Society, whose declared goal was "to engage in the great work of christianizing and civilizing Africa". When the Civil War started, Garnet's hopes ended for emigration as a solution for American Blacks. In the three-day New York draft riots of July 1863, mobs attacked Blacks and Black-owned buildings. Garnet and his family escaped attack because his daughter quickly chopped their nameplate off their door before the mobs found them. He organized a committee for sick soldiers and served as almoner to the New York Benevolent Society for victims of the mob.

When the federal government approved creating Black units, Garnet helped with recruiting United States Colored Troops.  He moved with his family to Washington, DC, so that he could support the black soldiers and the war effort.  He preached to many of them while serving as pastor of the prominent Liberty (Fifteenth) Street Presbyterian Church from 1864 until 1866.  During this time, Garnet was the first Black minister to preach to the US House of Representatives, addressing them on February 12, 1865, about the end of slavery, on occasion of the passage of the Thirteenth Amendment.

Later life
After the war in 1868, Garnet was appointed president of Avery College in Pittsburgh, Pennsylvania. Later he returned to New York City as a pastor at the Shiloh Presbyterian Church (formerly the First Colored Presbyterian Church, and now St. James Presbyterian Church in Harlem).

He remained politically active upon his return to New York, and was known to provide support to the Cuban independence movement. In 1878, while living at 102 West 3rd Street, in a neighborhood often referred to as Little Africa, Garnet hosted a reception for Cuban revolutionary leader Antonio Maceo.

His first wife Julia Williams died at their home in Allegheny City, Pennsylvania, on January 7, 1870. In 1875, Garnet married Sarah Smith Tompkins, who was a New York teacher and school principal, suffragist, and community organizer.

Ambassador to Liberia
Garnet's last wish was to go, even for a few weeks, to Liberia, where his daughter Mary Garnet Barboza was, and to die there. He was appointed as the U.S. Minister (ambassador) to Liberia, where he arrived on December 28, 1881, and died February 13 of malaria. Garnet was given a state funeral by the Liberian government. As described by Alexander Crummell:

He was buried at Palm Grove Cemetery in Monrovia.

Frederick Douglass, who had not been on speaking terms with Garnet for many years because of their differences, still mourned Garnet's passing and noted his achievements.

Legacy and honors
 1952, Garnet's portrait was included among those in Civil Rights Bill Passes, 1866, a mural painted in the Hall of Capitols, the Cox Corridors of the Capitol building in Washington, DC. It was painted by Allyn Cox.
 P.S. 175 or the Henry Highland Garnet School for Success in Harlem, as well as the Henry Highland Garnet Elementary School in Chestertown, Maryland, are named for him.
 In 2002, scholar Molefi Kete Asante listed Henry Highland Garnet on his list of 100 Greatest African Americans.
 The Garnet School built at 10th and U, NW, in Washington, DC, was named in his honor in 1880. It was merged with the Patterson school in a new building erected in 1929 and renamed Shaw Middle School at Garnet-Patterson. It was closed in 2013.
 Garnet High School, Charleston, West Virginia, was named for him from 1900 until 1956 when it closed with desegregation.  The building served as John Adams Junior High until 1969 when a new John Adams school was built.  Garnet's name was restored as the Garnet Adult Education Center and is now Garnet Career Center.
 Garnet is included on a New Hampshire historical marker (number 246) commemorating Noyes Academy in Canaan.

See also
 List of African-American abolitionists

Notes

References

Further reading
 Piersen, William Dillon, Black Legacy: America's Hidden Heritage, University of Massachusetts Press, 1993,

External links

Henry H. Garnet, "An Address to the Slaves of the United States of America", Buffalo, NY, 1843, Digital Commons
Henry H. Garnet, "The Past and the Present Condition, and the Destiny, of the Colored Race" (1848), Digital Commons
 
 
Underground Workshop

1815 births
1882 deaths
19th-century American clergy
19th-century American diplomats
African Free School alumni
African-American abolitionists
African-American college graduates before 1865
Ambassadors of the United States to Liberia
American expatriates in Jamaica
American expatriates in the United Kingdom
American pan-Africanists
American Presbyterian ministers
American Presbyterian missionaries
American temperance activists
Burials in Liberia
Deaths from malaria
Fugitive American slaves
New York (state) Libertyites
Noyes Academy students who enrolled at the Oneida Institute
Oneida Institute alumni
People from Kent County, Maryland
People from Manhattan
People from Peterboro, New York
People from Troy, New York
People of New York (state) in the American Civil War
Presbyterian abolitionists